Brekkom is a village in Ringebu Municipality in Innlandet county, Norway.

References

Ringebu
Villages in Innlandet